Demented Death Farm Massacre is a 1971 horror film directed by Fred Olen Ray and Donn Davison and features screen legend John Carradine as 'the Judge of Hell', who narrates the story.

Plot
A group of jewel thieves on the lam run out of fuel in the middle of the countryside. They wander into a backwoods farm, hoping to hide out for the time being. However, when the farmer returns home only to find the thieves taking over the house, he hatches a deadly plan.

Cast
Ashley Brooks as Reba Sue Craven
George Ellis as Harlan P. Craven
Trudy Moore as Karen
Mike Coolik as Kirk
Jim Peck as Phillip
Pepper Thurston as Susan
Valarie Lipsey as Madame Jessabelle
R. Kenneth Wade as Toby
John Carradine as the Judge of Hell

Other titles
Honey Britches
Moonshiner's Women
Shantytown Honeymoon (original title)
Hillbilly Hooker
Little Whorehouse on the Prairie

Release
Producer Fred Olen Ray bought the obscure, and barely released, 1971 film Shantytown Honeymoon, shot several new scenes with John Carradine as the Judge of Hell and gave it a limited theatrical release as Demented Death Farm Massacre.

Home media
In 1986, Olen Ray sold the film to Troma under the new title, who released it on VHS. Troma would later re-release it in various DVD packages alongside lesser known titles that had been purchased for distribution.

See also
 List of American films of 1971

External links

 Demented Death Farm Massacre – at the Troma Entertainment movie database

Films directed by Fred Olen Ray
1971 films
1971 horror films
American independent films
Troma Entertainment films
1971 independent films
1970s English-language films
1970s American films